CMDA can refer to:

 Christian Medical and Dental Associations, a  professional medical association
 Chennai Metropolitan Development Authority, is the nodal planning agency within the Chennai Metropolitan Area